Last Night on Earth: Live in Tokyo is a live EP by the American rock band Green Day, recorded live at the Akasaka BLITZ, Tokyo, Japan on May 28, 2009. It was released in Japan and iTunes on November 11, 2009, and was later released as an import in other countries on December 1, 2009. The EP got to #31 in Japan on the Oricon Weekly Charts and got to number 197 on the Billboard Top 200. Only 2 songs ("Basket Case" and "Geek Stink Breath") from the live EP were not from 21st Century Breakdown. Although titled after "Last Night on Earth" from 21st Century Breakdown, the song is not featured on this extended play.

Track listing

References

External links
 Warner Music Japan - Green Day - Last Night on Earth (Live in Tokyo) (Japanese)

2009 EPs
2009 live albums
Albums recorded at Akasaka Blitz
Green Day EPs
Live EPs
Reprise Records EPs
Reprise Records live albums
Warner Music Group live albums
Warner Music Group EPs